Konstantinos Georgakopoulos (born 24 February 1999) is a Greek professional footballer who plays as a right-back for Diavolitsi.

References

1999 births
Living people
Greek footballers
Super League Greece 2 players
Gamma Ethniki players
Acharnaikos F.C. players
Apollon Larissa F.C. players
Association football defenders
Footballers from Kalamata
21st-century Greek people